Tashkuh may refer to:
 Tashkooh, mountain in Khuzestan Province
 Tashkuh-e Olya, Mazandaran Province
 Tashkuh-e Sofla, Mazandaran Province
 Tashkuh-e Vosta, Mazandaran Province